CollegeHumor is an Internet comedy company based in Los Angeles. Aside from producing content for release on YouTube, it was also a former humor website owned by InterActiveCorp (IAC) from 2006 until January 2020, when IAC withdrew funding and the website shut down. Since then, CollegeHumor has continued to release content on YouTube and its streaming service, Dropout.  The site featured daily original humor videos and articles created by its in-house writing and production team, in addition to user-submitted videos, pictures, articles and links. Created by Josh Abramson and Ricky Van Veen in 1999, CollegeHumor is operated by CH Media, which also operates Dorkly.com and Dropout.tv, and formerly operated Drawfee.com.

CH Media is also a partner of the website BustedTees, an online clothing website.

Many of its staff also operated the sister website Dorkly, centering on fandoms and video game parodies in the vein of CollegeHumor before the site ceased publication of new articles in January 2019. Like CollegeHumor, despite the website shutting down, Dorkly continues to release new original content on YouTube and is now in overt collaboration with CollegeHumor's longtime partner for animated content Lowbrow Studios.

History
The CollegeHumor website was created in December 1999 by Josh Abramson and Ricky Van Veen, with help from web developer Jake Lodwick. Abramson and Van Veen were high school friends from Baltimore, Maryland. The site traffic reached approximately 30,000 monthly American users. They started the site by posting funny photos, essays, and videos that their friends created.

Abramson said in an interview that they wanted to start "an advertisement-based business because at the time the advertising market was pretty hot and we'd seen other people develop Web sites that were popular making a lot of money." Their aim was to create a humor site that would appeal to the advertiser-friendly college-aged demographic.

CollegeHumor, along with its parent company, Connected Ventures, was acquired by Barry Diller's IAC in August 2006.

CollegeHumor has become known for its original comedy content. The site has been nominated for the Webby Award in the humor category, and many of their individual videos have been nominated for and/or won Webby Awards. Recent winners include "Pixar Intro Parody" for Best Animation, "Web Site Story" for Best Individual Short or Episode, and Jake and Amir for Best Series. Their shorts "Awkward Rap" and "Hand Vagina" were nominated for the Webby Award for Best Comedy: Individual Short or Episode in 2008 and 2009 with other nominees and winners since.

In 2014, CollegeHumor was listed on New Media Rockstars Top 100 Channels, ranked at number 76.

On September 26, 2018, CollegeHumor launched Dropout, a subscription service that includes uncensored and original video series, animations, and other forms of media including comics and fictionalized chat conversations.

On January 23, 2019,  CollegeHumor announced on the Dorkly homepage that they would be ceasing the publication of new articles and comics on the Dorkly site in favor of shifting to other platforms for new material, citing increased costs of the website and the decline of ad based revenue for publications such as Dorkly.

On January 8, 2020, it was announced that IAC was selling CollegeHumor to its Chief Creative Officer, Sam Reich, resulting in the job loss of nearly all employees and staff. However Sam Reich later clarified that the company would keep a skeleton crew of mostly technical staff in employment in order to continue releasing pre-recorded CollegeHumor content on its streaming platform Dropout for at least the next 6 months. The only creative left on the payroll was Brennan Lee Mulligan, Dungeon Master of the series Dimension 20.

In July 2020, a Dropout.tv newsletter noted that production is beginning on new seasons of various Dropout shows.

Features

Videos
CollegeHumor produced original comedy videos under the CH Originals (formerly known as CHTV) banner. In addition, the website hosted a large collection of user-submitted viral videos, encompassing home movies, bizarre sports highlights, sketches, and such. These videos were released one month prior to being posted on the CollegeHumor YouTube channel.

, The CollegeHumor YouTube channel had over 7.39 billion views and 14.6 million subscribers.

Pictures
CollegeHumor's pictures section featured user-submitted photographs. Like the site's videos, CollegeHumor's pictures were of a humorous or bizarre nature. CollegeHumor also occasionally held photo-based contests for its users. This feature has since fallen out of use and is no longer updated.

Articles
CollegeHumor posted original writing from its staff and users, including humorous essays, comics, interviews and weekly columns on sports, video games, college life, and dating. Contributing writers to the site have included notable comedians Steve Hofstetter, Christian Finnegan, Brooks Wheelan, Paul Scheer, Amir Blumenfeld, and Judah Friedlander. Andrew Bridgman curated the articles and edits the website's front page.

CH Originals

CH Originals was CollegeHumor's original comedy video section, featuring sketches and short films written and produced by the CollegeHumor staff, which included Patrick Cassels, Emily Axford, Adam Conover, Mike Trapp, and Brian Murphy (among others). CH Originals videos included sketch comedy, film and television parodies, animation, and music videos. In addition to stand-alone viral comedy shorts or "one-offs", which are usually shot on location and feature hired actors, CH Originals also produced a number of series—notably "Hardly Working", "Jake and Amir", and "Nerd Alert"—which were shot in the CH office and starred the CH staff members themselves.

List of CH Originals series

Jake and Amir

A series of short sketches about two former CH writers, Jake Hurwitz and Amir Blumenfeld, who often act out the odd couple act. The show depicts Jake as a regular guy constantly annoyed by Amir's idiotic antics, while Amir sincerely just wants to be good friends with Jake. The show's final episode aired in April 2015.

Full Benefits
A series of sketches written by and starring Sarah Schneider and David Young about two coworkers and their attempts to keep their relationship hidden. Each episode usually begins with them waking up in the same bed after having one of their numerous one night stands. This series ended when Sarah Schneider left College Humor in November 2011.

TV RPG
An animated parody of popular TV series using the likeness of retro-style role-playing games.

POV
Sketches shot from the point-of-view of the main character, often voiced by Vincent Peone, CollegeHumor's cinematographer. These sketches are known for realism and relatability (in a humorous manner) and are among CH's most popular videos. In most POV videos the phrase "How is that even possible?" is often used as a running gag.

The Six
A set of videos starring Josh Ruben, each of which feature six outrageous scenarios in certain situations, such as getting out of the friend zone or having "monsters" for roommates. The videos are narrated in second-person, using Ruben as an analogy for the viewer.

Prank War
A series that documents the escalating pranks that are played between former CH staffers Streeter Seidell and Amir Blumenfeld. Prank War gained national notoriety after Amir staged a fake public marriage proposal from Streeter to his girlfriend Sharon at a New York Yankees game. The incident was known as "The Yankee Prankee" and was later featured on VH1's "40 Greatest Pranks Part 2". Seidell and Blumenfeld have appeared twice on Jimmy Kimmel Live! to discuss their pranks. They have both since acknowledged the pranks to be pre-planned in advance and fake.

The All-Nighter
An annual event started in 2007 in which the CH staff shoots and posts 12 videos in one night between 9 pm and 9 am. While doing so, they communicate with fans via Twitter and UStream.

Dire Consequences
A series involving Kevin Corrigan and Brian K. Murphy, who each bet each other to do a wacky action, such as wearing progressively smaller clothes as a day goes by, or playing paintball solo against a group of US Army soldiers. The person who does these things is usually chosen at the beginning of the episode.

Adam Ruins Everything

A series that has Adam Conover informing the other character and the audience about the misconceptions related to the character's statement. Adam also voices versions of himself in animated segments with some of them being narrated by Chris Parnell. This segment later gained a TV spin-off on truTV.

IRL Files
Stories about a never-seen narrator who gets involved in wacky situations.

Very Mary-Kate

A series that revolves around the life of Mary-Kate Olsen (played by Elaine Carroll), a rich young woman who is heir to Woody Allen, and her sensible bodyguard.

Hello, My Name Is...
A series starring Pat Cassels and Josh Ruben. Ruben is placed in prosthetic and make-up by their make-up artist Hannah. From the prosthetic, Ruben spontaneously creates a character which Pat then interviews.

Troopers
A series that parodies of sci-fi movies and shows, particularly Star Wars. Shorts mostly focus on a pair of stormtrooper-like soldiers, Larry (portrayed by Josh Ruben) and Rich (portrayed by Sam Reich), and the humorous problems that arise from working for an evil interstellar empire aboard a small, moon-sized, planet-destroying space station. Features Aubrey Plaza in a recurring guest role as the Princess.

Dinosaur Office
A stop-motion series released via Nintendo Video on the Nintendo 3DS/2DS. The stop-motion shorts focus on Craig the Triceratops (voiced by Kevin Corrigan) and Todd the Apatosaurus (voiced by Caldwell Tanner) as they work at DinoSoft Limited with co-workers Sheila the Stegosaurus (voiced by Emily Axford), Richard the Diplodocus (voiced by Brian K. Murphy), various interns, and their boss Terry the Tyrannosaurus (voiced by Sam Reich). The dinosaurs face typical office problems such as rushing to meet deadlines and trying to decide what to have for lunch while also facing less typical problems such as asteroid warnings on the news, volcano drills, and corporate takeovers.

BearShark
A traditionally animated series that features a bear (voiced by Kevin Corrigan) and a shark (voiced by Owen Parsons) teaming up to eat a man named Steve (voiced by Caldwell Tanner) and always succeeding (though Steve always comes back) only for them to slowly develop a friendship with him. This series received its own video game in 2013 on the Nintendo eShop.

Badman
A series that parodies the Christopher Nolan Batman films. The shorts involve Batman (played by Pete Holmes), who—unlike in the movies and comics—is portrayed as oblivious and incompetent, much to the annoyance of friends and foes alike. Matt McCarthy plays a number of roles, including Commissioner Jim Gordon, Detective Flass, Two-Face, and The Riddler. Other guest stars include Kumail Nanjiani and Patton Oswalt.

Precious Plum
A series starring Josh Ruben and Very Mary-Kate star Elaine Carroll and written by Carroll and CollegeHumor's president of original content, Sam Reich. It is a parody of Here Comes Honey Boo Boo. It replaced Very Mary-Kate in the Thursday release slot of CollegeHumor, and Sam Reich announced that there would be two more episodes over the next two weeks, and more would be made imminently.

The Adventures of Kim Jong Un
A cartoon series which is a parody of the Supreme Leader of North Korea and the propaganda of that country. Kim Jong-un is shown to possess various abilities and powers, which he uses to battle enemies of the state, plotting to harm True Korea. His adversaries are generally depicted as weak and foolish individuals. Typically the ending of each episode features a scene in which Kim Jong-un's recently deceased father returns from the dead in some way and violently fights with his son. His enemies are mostly shown as democratic leaders like Obama. Kim rides on a unicorn that flies on a flying carpet.

Furry Force
A cartoon series featuring anthropomorphic superheroes which won the 2014 Ursa Major award for "Best Anthropomorphic Dramatic Short Work or Series". Described to be a cartoon on Fox Kids, Furry Force tells the story of four teens named Leon (voiced by Brian K. Murphy), Gary (voiced by Caldwell Tanner), Callie (voiced by Emily Axford), and Trang (voiced by Rachel Ilg) who become anthropomorphic animals to take on the evil plots of Victor Vivisector (voiced by Adam Conover) and his henchmen Hip Hop (voiced by Adam Conover) and Krunk (voiced by Josh Ruben) that mostly involve turning the forest into a parking lot. Leon turns into an anthropomorphic lion in a male g-string, Gary turns into a "wolftaur", Callie turns into an anthropomorphic squirrel with large breasts, and Trang turns into an anthropomorphic cow with udder-shaped breasts. The Furry Force's animal forms appear to be a combination of both gross and sexy to most people in a given episode, which often causes Hip Hop and Krunk to kill themselves (yet turn up alive in the next episode).

If Google was a Guy
Actor Brian Huskey personifies the search engine Google, who deals with a variety of people who come into his office and tells him what to search. He reacts to the search depending on the person searching and the actual question. Cameos of other website personas include Siri (Alison Becker), WebMD (Roger Anthony), the NSA (Brian Sacca), and Bing (Randall Park). Other notable guest stars include Colton Dunn, George Basil, D'Arcy Carden, Milana Vayntrub, Jon Gabrus, and Mark McGrath as himself. Jewel guest starred as herself in a special animated episode released during the COVID-19 pandemic.

Hot Date

Brian K. Murphy and Emily Axford attempt a lovely night out for a romantic meal, but sadly blow their chances by bringing themselves.

WTF 101
A cartoon series parodying The Magic School Bus featuring students learning about biology, history, and other subjects, usually in a gross and/or disturbing manner. Mary Pat Gleason voiced the deranged teacher, Ms. Foxtrot. The series is streamed on CollegeHumor's Dropout app.

Other series
Previously, CH Originals produced The Michael Showalter Showalter, a Charlie Rose-style comedic interview series hosted by Michael Showalter and featuring guests such as Paul Rudd, Andy Samberg, David Cross, Zach Galifianakis, and Michael Cera. They also gained notoriety for "Street Fighter: The Later Years", which was nominated for "Best Series" by YouTube's Video Awards. In 2011, they featured Bad Dads, a series of five, three-minute shorts starring Michael Cera and Will Hines. The series was written, directed, and produced by Derek Westerman.

Also previously produced by College Humor were Bleep Bloop and Nerd Alert. Bleep Bloop was a video-game-based talk show hosted by Jeff Rubin and Patrick Cassels, featuring various guests. Many comedians were featured on the show.

Dropout series

In 2018, CollegeHumor created the subscription-based streaming platform Dropout, which became the home for a number of new scripted and unscripted series. After the company was sold to Sam Reich in 2020, budget constraints led to the cancellation of all scripted series in favor of more budget-friendly unscripted series. Ongoing series at Dropout include:

Dimension 20 

A live play tabletop role-playing show usually starring Brennan Lee Mulligan as the Dungeon Master. It primarily uses Dungeons & Dragons 5th edition rules, and debuted in 2018.

Dirty Laundry 
A game show hosted by Lily Du in which contestants submit secrets about themselves, and other players have to guess which player the secret is about. Each episode has a specialty cocktail in which the contestants can drink, and the bartender is Grant Anthony O'Brien. Secrets can also be submitted by both the host and the bartender to add further difficulty in the game.

Game Changer 
A game show hosted by Sam Reich in which each episode is a different game and contestants are not told what they are playing before the show. In order to win the game, they must figure out the rules as they play. Special guest appearances have included Jewel, Michael Winslow, Ty Mitchell, Bob the Drag Queen, Tony Hawk, and Giancarlo Esposito. A spinoff was created, titled Make Some Noise,  where contestants are given improv, impression, and sound-effect challenges. Guest players have included SungWon Cho, Jacob Wysocki, and Jessica McKenna.

Um, Actually 
A game show hosted by Mike Trapp in which contestants win points by correcting untrue statements about pop culture. Contestants must begin their corrections with the phrase "Um, actually...", or risk losing the point. Guests have included Matthew Mercer, Rachel Bloom, Demi Adejuyigbe, Kristian Nairn, Doug Jones, Maddox, Justin McElroy, Travis McElroy, Alice Wetterlund, Lindsay Jones, Zach Sherwin, Thomas Middleditch, and "Weird Al" Yankovic.

Alumni
Many members of the writing and acting staff of CollegeHumor have gone on to larger productions after their time with the website.

 Kelly Marie Tran gained global prominence for her role as Rose Tico in the Star Wars sequel trilogy films The Last Jedi (2017) and The Rise of Skywalker (2019). She also voiced Raya in the animated film Raya and the Last Dragon (2021)
 Jake Hurwitz and Amir Blumenfeld founded the HeadGum podcast network in 2015, which now comprises over 40 different podcasts
 Sarah Schneider became a staff writer on Saturday Night Live in 2010, before serving as head writer for the series' 42nd season from 2016 to 2017 She went on to co-create the Comedy Central show The Other Two with writer Chris Kelly.
 Streeter Seidell joined the writing staff at Saturday Night Live and was a writer on the short-lived ABC show Trophy Wife
 Will Stephen joined the writing staff for Saturday Night Live in 2015
 Dan Gurewitch became a staff writer on Last Week Tonight with John Oliver
 Patrick Cassels became a staff writer on Full Frontal with Samantha Bee
 CollegeHumor and Dorkly writer Owen Parsons went on to write for The Daily Show as well as The Opposition with Jordan Klepper, before becoming a staff writer on Last Week Tonight with John Oliver
 CollegeHumor and Dorkly writer Ben Joseph went on to write for several animated series, including The Simpsons and Wander Over Yonder, as well as the short-lived live-action series Me, Myself & I
 Adam Conover went on to create the truTV show Adam Ruins Everything, based on the CollegeHumor series of the same name
 Brian K. Murphy and Emily Axford went on to create the Pop television series Hot Date in addition to working on Adam Ruins Everything
 David Young went on to write for The Tonight Show Starring Jimmy Fallon and Carpool Karaoke: The Series
 Siobhan Thompson went on to write for the Adult Swim animated sci-fi comedy series Rick and Morty

The CollegeHumor Show

On December 17, 2008, CollegeHumor.com announced The CollegeHumor Show, a scripted comedy that premiered on MTV on February 8, 2009. The half-hour comedy was written by and starred nine CollegeHumor editorial staff members (Ricky Van Veen, Jake Hurwitz, Amir Blumenfeld, Dan Gurewitch, Patrick Cassels, Sarah Schneider, Streeter Seidell, Sam Reich and Jeff Rubin), who played fictionalized versions of themselves.

Books

References

External links

 
Internet properties established in 1999
Online companies of the United States
YouTube channels
Comedy-related YouTube channels
1999 establishments in California
Entertainment companies established in 1999
Entertainment companies based in California